The Werehouse is the center of an artist collective in Winston-Salem, North Carolina.

External links
Krankies Coffeehouse website
Winston-Salem Office Of Cultural Affairs
 GoTriad Barnstormers article
 Wake Forest News article on Werehouse artist
 GoRadio interview with member of Werehouse kidnapped in Haiti

American artist groups and collectives
Culture of Winston-Salem, North Carolina
Intentional communities in the United States